Mac or MAC most commonly refers to:

 Mac (computer), a line of personal computers made by Apple Inc.
 Mackintosh, a raincoat made of rubberized cloth
 A variant of the word macaroni, mostly used in the name of the dish mac and cheese
 Mac, Gaelic for "son", a prefix to family names often appearing in Gaelic names
 McIntosh (apple), a common cultivar of apple originating in Canada, and the inspiration for the computer line's name

Mac or MAC may also refer to:

Arts, entertainment, and media

Fictional entities 
 Mac (Green Wing), a television character
 Mac (It's Always Sunny in Philadelphia), a television character
 Mac Gargan, an enemy of Spider-Man
 Mac Foster, a character on Foster's Home for Imaginary Friends
 Angus "Mac" MacGyver, from the television series MacGyver
 Cindy "Mac" Mackenzie, from the TV series Veronica Mars
 Lt. Col. Sarah MacKenzie, from the TV series JAG
 Dr. Terrence McAfferty, from Robert Muchamore's CHERUB and Henderson's Boys novel series
 "Mac" McAnnally, in The Dresden Files series
 Randle McMurphy, in the movie One Flew Over the Cuckoo's Nest
 Mac Taylor, from the TV series CSI: NY
 Mac, a canine character in the television series Clifford the Big Red Dog
 Monster Attack Crew, a fictional pilot squadron in the television series Ultraman Leo
 MAC (Mysterious Alien Creature), the titular character in the 1988 film Mac and Me

Other uses in arts, entertainment, and media 
 Mac (film), 1992 directed by and starring John Turturro
 Mac (novel), by John MacLean
 Mac, a Sports Beanie Baby cardinal produced by Ty, Inc. in 1999
 MAC Awards, for achievements in cabaret, comedy, and jazz, administered by the Manhattan Association of Cabarets & Clubs
 Mac the Moose, a public statue in Moose Jaw, Saskatchewan, Canada; formerly the World's Largest Moose

Business and economics 

 Marginal Abatement Cost, a concept in environmental economics
 Material adverse change, a provision in mergers and acquisitions contracts and venture financing agreements

Organizations

Businesses 
 MAC Cosmetics, a cosmetics brand, stylized as M•A•C
 Mac Para Technology, a Czech aircraft manufacturer
 Macerich, an American real estate investment trust (NYSE stock symbol MAC)
 Manufacture d'armes de Châtellerault, a French state arms manufacturer
 Martin's Air Charter, now Martinair, an airline
 Morgan Advanced Ceramics, a ceramics manufacturing company

Government and military agencies 
 Mainland Affairs Council, an agency under the Executive Yuan of the Republic of China
 Medicare Administrative Contractor, a private company contracted to administer Medicare benefits in the U.S.
 Metropolitan Airports Commission, the operator of airports in the Minneapolis-St. Paul area
 Military Affairs Commission in China; see Central Military Commission (People's Republic of China)
 Military Airlift Command, the predecessor of the Air Mobility Command of the United States Air Force
 Municipal Assistance Corporation, created by the State of New York in 1975 to deal with New York City's fiscal crisis

Non-profit organizations 
 mac (Birmingham), formerly known as the Midlands Arts Centre, in Birmingham, UK
 Malaysian AIDS Council
 Marine Aquarium Council
 Myanmar Accountancy Council

Political groups 
 Mouvement d'Action Civique, a defunct Belgian far right group
 Mouvement Autonome Casamançais (Casamancian Autonomous Movement), a defunct political party in Casamance, Senegal
 Mudiad Amddiffyn Cymru, a Welsh organization responsible for several bombing incidents
 Muslims Against Crusades, a UK-based Islamic group noted for burning poppies during the Remembrance Day silence in 2010

Schools 

 Macdonald Campus of McGill University, Canada
 McMaster University, in Canada
 Michigan Agricultural College, former name of Michigan State University

Sports organizations

Clubs and teams 
 Maranhão Atlético Clube, a Brazilian association football club
 Marília Atlético Clube, a Brazilian association football club
 Missouri Athletic Club, a traditional gentlemen's and athletic club in downtown St. Louis, Missouri
 Multnomah Athletic Club, a private athletic club in Oregon

Conferences 
 Macomb Area Conference, a Michigan high school football conference
 Mayflower Athletic Conference, a high school athletic conference in Massachusetts
 Mid-American Conference, an NCAA Division I (Football Bowl Subdivision) sports conference
 Mid-Atlantic Athletic Conference, a Washington, D.C., area high school athletic league
 Mid-Atlantic Rifle Conference, an NCAA rifle-only conference
 Midwest Athletic Conference, an Ohio high school athletic conference in west-central Ohio
 Middle Atlantic Conferences, an umbrella organization for three NCAA Division III sports conferences
 Middle Atlantic Conference, one of the three conferences of the above, used to organize competition in some sports
 Mississippi Athletic Conference, a high school sports conference in the Iowa Quad Cities
 Mountain Athletic Conference (NCHSAA), a North Carolina high school athletic conference
 Mountain Athletic Conference (PIAA), a Pennsylvania high school athletic conference

People

Names 
 Mac, Gaelic for "son", a prefix to family names often appearing in Irish and Scottish names
 Mac (nickname)
 Mạc (surname), Anglicized surname or Mạc (Vietnamese surname)
 Mạc dynasty, 16th-century rulers in Vietnam

People with the nickname or professional name 

 Mac (rapper) (born 1977), American rapper, stage name of McKinley Phipps Jr
 MC Mac, member and musician of So Solid Crew
 John McCarthy (conductor) (1916–2009), British conductor known as "John Mac" or just "Mac"
 Derek McCulloch (1897–1967), British radio broadcaster known as "Uncle Mac"
 Ian McCulloch (singer) (born 1959), commonly referred to as "Mac the Mouth" or just "Mac"
 Stanley McMurtry (born 1936), British cartoonist with the pen name "Mac"

Places

Inhabited places 
Fort McMurray, Alberta, Canada, nicknamed "Fort Mac"
Macau, a special administrative region of the People's Republic of China, ISO 3166 code MAC
Macedonia (disambiguation), various places

Museums and arts centers 

 mac (Birmingham), formerly known as the Midlands Arts Centre, in Birmingham, UK
 Metropolitan Arts Centre, Belfast, UK
 Archaeology Museum of Catalonia (Museu d'Arqueologia de Catalunya), an archaeology museum in Catalonia, Spain
 Niterói Contemporary Art Museum (Museu de Arte Contemporânea de Niterói), a museum in Niterói, Brazil

Other facilities 
Macomb (Amtrak station), Illinois, United States, Amtrak station code MAC
UCLA Marina Aquatic Center, a recreational facility in Marina del Rey, California

Science and technology

Biology and medicine 
 MAC (chemotherapy), a chemotherapy regimen of Mitoxantrone and Ara-C
 Maximum allowable concentration, a concept related to threshold limit value (TLV)
 Membrane attack complex, an immune system function using complement
 Microbiota-accessible carbohydrates, a category of carbohydrates consumed by gut microbes
 Minimum alveolar concentration, a measure used to compare the strengths of anesthetic vapors
 Mitochondrial apoptosis-induced channel, the cytochrome c release pore of apoptotic mitochondria
 Monitored anesthesia care, a form of anesthesia with partial awareness
 Mycobacterium avium complex, a group of environmental pathogens

Computing and telecommunication 
 MAC address, or Ethernet Hardware Address (EHA), the OSI layer 2 address of network interfaces
 .mac, a file extension for macros in Agilent ChemStation software
 Mac (computer), a brand of computers and computer operating systems made by Apple Inc.
 macOS, formerly Mac OS X and OS X, Apple's current operating system for Mac computers
 Classic Mac OS, the original operating system for Apple's Macintosh
 .Mac, now iCloud, a subscription service by Apple
 MAC times, metadata which record times of events associated with a computer file
 Mandatory access control, a type of access control in computer security
 Maximum activate count, a parameter associated with the LPDDR4 memory's TRR feature that mitigates the row hammer effect
 Medium access control (often "Media Access Control"), a sublayer of the Data Link layer
 Message authentication code, used to authenticate a message in cryptography
 Migration Authorisation Code, a unique code used when switching between DSL Internet service providers in the UK
 Multiplexed Analogue Components, a proposed satellite television transmission standard
 Multiply–accumulate operation, or multiplier–accumulator, in digital signal processing

Transportation 
 Mean aerodynamic chord, a measure of the geometry of an airfoil
 Merchant aircraft carrier, used during World War II by Britain and the Netherlands
 Mid-air collision, a type of aircraft accident

Weapons 
 Mac-10 (Military Armament Corporation Model 10, officially the M10), a compact, blowback-operated machine pistol
 Mac-11, a sub-compact version of the Model 10 machine pistol

Other uses in science and technology 
 Mission assurance, an engineering process
 MAC (Money Access Card), an ATM (automated teller machine) card

Other uses 
 MAC Award, or Hermann Trophy, the highest award in American college soccer
 Mackintosh, a raincoat made of rubberized cloth
 Modern Army Combatives, a hand-to-hand combat training regimen
 Material adequacy condition, a concept in the philosophies of logic and language

See also 
Big Mac (disambiguation)
Little Mac (disambiguation)
McIntosh (disambiguation)
Macintosh (disambiguation)
Macaroni
Macaroni and cheese, or "mac and cheese" in American and Canadian English
Mach (disambiguation)
Mack (disambiguation)
Mak (disambiguation)